The city of Tillamook  is the county seat of Tillamook County, Oregon, United States. The city is located on the southeast end of Tillamook Bay on the Pacific Ocean. The population was 5,231 at the 2020 census.

History
The city is named for the Tillamook people, a Native American tribe speaking a Salishan language who lived in this area until the early 19th century. Anthropologist Franz Boas identifies the Tillamook Native Americans as the southernmost branch of the Coast Salish peoples of the Pacific Northwest. This group was separated geographically from the northern branch by tribes of Chinookan peoples who occupied territory between them. The name Tillamook, he says, is of Chinook origin, and refers to the people of a locality known as Elim or Kelim. They spoke Tillamook, a combination of two dialects. Tillamook culture differed from that of the northern Coast Salish, Boas says, and might have been influenced by tribal cultures to the south, in what is now northern California.

Captain Robert Gray first anchored in Tillamook Bay in 1788, marking the first recorded European landing on the Oregon coast. Settlers began arriving in the early 1850s, and Tillamook County was created by the Territorial legislature in 1853. In 1862, the town itself was laid out, and the first post office was opened in 1866.  The town was voted to be the county seat in 1873, and Tillamook was officially incorporated as a city in 1891.

During World War II, the United States Navy operated a blimp patrol station near the town at Naval Air Station Tillamook. The station was decommissioned in 1948, and the remaining facility now houses the Tillamook Air Museum.

Geography
The Tillamook area is also home to five rivers, the Tillamook, Trask, Wilson, Kilchis, and the Miami just north of the city.

Climate
Tillamook has a climate that lies between the cool-summer Mediterranean climate (Csb) and the oceanic climate (Cfb). The city has a mild and wet climate with very little seasonal temperature variation due to its proximity to the Pacific Ocean. Snowfall is very rare, but winter floods are a common occurrence. Between April and October, the precipitation in Tillamook is comparatively lighter than other coastal cities, but still remains much wetter than the population centers in the Willamette Valley. Tillamook's annual precipitation averages about  compared to only  in Portland. Summers in Tillamook are brief and mild with average daytime temperatures in the upper 60s, although daytime temperatures can occasionally soar into the 80s and 90s for days at a time. Summer is by far the driest season in Tillamook with only 1.35 inches and 1.33 inches of rain (34 mm in either case) falling in July and August, respectively.

Demographics

2010 census
As of the census of 2010, there were 4,935 people, 2,037 households, and 1,192 families living in the city. The racial makeup of the city was 86.5% White, 0.2% African American, 1.5% Native American, 1.1% Asian, 0.8% Pacific Islander, 6.9% from other races, and 3.0% from two or more races. Hispanic or Latino of any race were 17.2% of the population.

There were 2,037 households, of which 33.5% had children under the age of 18 living with them, 39.9% were married couples living together, 13.5% had a female householder with no husband present, 5.1% had a male householder with no wife present, and 41.5% were non-families. 34.5% of all households were made up of individuals, and 15.4% had someone living alone who was 65 years of age or older. The average household size was 2.41 and the average family size was 3.11.

The median age in the city was 33.7 years. 27% of residents were under the age of 18; 9.8% were between the ages of 18 and 24; 26.2% were from 25 to 44; 23% were from 45 to 64; and 14% were 65 years of age or older. The gender makeup of the city was 48.3% male and 51.7% female.

2000 census
As of the census of 2000, there were 4,352 people, 1,758 households, and 1,105 families living in the city. The population density was 2,818.8 people per square mile (1,091.1/km). There were 1,898 housing units at an average density of 1,229.3 per square mile (475.9/km). The racial makeup of the city was 92.56% White, 0.16% African American, 1.22% Native American, 0.71% Asian, 0.16% Pacific Islander, 3.42% from other races, and 1.77% from two or more races. Hispanic or Latino of any race were 11.12% of the population.

There were 1,758 households, out of which 33.3% had children under the age of 18 living with them, 44.7% were married couples living together, 12.5% had a female householder with no husband present, and 37.1% were non-families. 32.1% of all households were made up of individuals, and 13.1% had someone living alone who was 65 years of age or older. The average household size was 2.46 and the average family size was 3.08.

In the city, the population dispersal was 29.2% under the age of 18, 9.4% from 18 to 24, 28.1% from 25 to 44, 19.6% from 45 to 64, and 13.6% who were 65 years of age or older. The median age was 33 years. For every 100 females, there were 96.0 males. For every 100 females age 18 and over, there were 92.1 males.

The median income for a household in the city was $29,875, and the median income for a family was $36,351. Males had a median income of $28,458 versus $20,801 for females. The per capita income for the city was $15,160. About 11.8% of families and 15.4% of the population were below the poverty line, including 18.2% of those under age 18 and 14.8% of those age 65 or over.

Economy
Historically, the Tillamook economy has been based primarily on dairy farms. The farmland surrounding the city is used for grazing the milk cattle that supply the Tillamook County Creamery Association's production of cheese, particularly cheddar, gourmet ice cream and yogurt, and other dairy products. Approximately one million people visit the cheese factory (located north of Tillamook on Highway 101) each year.

The lumber industry also is experiencing a comeback from the replanting that followed the Tillamook Burn forest fires of the mid-20th century. The burned remains of some of the trees can still be found in the forests surrounding Tillamook.

Tillamook also serves tourists on their way to the ocean beaches and as a location for second homes.

Arts and culture

Museums and other points of interest

The Tillamook Air Museum, which features over 15 aircraft, an Exhibit Hall with rare wartime and aviation-themed artifacts, is located just south of the city. It is housed in a wooden WWII blimp hangar that was once a part of Naval Air Station Tillamook. In 1991, illusionist David Copperfield filmed a train car disappearance illusion for a TV special in Hangar B. Its sister hangar (Hangar A) was destroyed by a fire in 1992. The hangars were built with old-growth trees and one can see the huge seamless beams inside the buildings.

The Tillamook Cheese Factory is the Tillamook County Creamery Association's original cheese production facility. The Tillamook Cheese Factory also serves as a Visitor Center and hosts over 1 million tourists each year. Visitors can learn about the cheese-making process, cheese-packaging process, and the ice cream-making process from a viewing gallery over the main production floor. Tours are self-guided and self-paced, and are augmented by video presentations and interactive kiosks. Tours inside the actual cheese-processing area of the plant were discontinued in 1967 due to health and safety regulations.

The Tillamook County Fair is world-famous for the annual Pig-N-Ford race where contestants have to catch a pig and race stripped Model T Fords around an oval track with the pig under one arm.

Education
Tillamook is served by the Tillamook School District. The city is home to seven schools and one college. Tillamook High School, Tillamook Junior High School, Wilson River School (Alternate Education), Trask River High School, East Elementary School, South Prairie Elementary School, Liberty Elementary School, and it contains the Tillamook Bay Community College.

Media
Tillamook's weekly newspaper is the Headlight-Herald. The city has three radio stations. KTIL-FM is a local radio station playing country. With a unique morning show and an interview section from 9:30–10:00 titled "Tillamook Today", which interviews local officials, business owners, and other individuals discussing what is currently going on within the county. KTIL (AM) broadcasts oldies. Originally, it operated as a talk radio station. In addition to the oldies, sporting events are broadcast. KDEP-FM used to broadcast classic rock, but has since transitioned to modern music. Several media personalities got their starts on KTIL. The most notable was nationally syndicated conservative talk host Lars Larson, who received his first job at the age of 16 on the station.

Transportation
 Tillamook Airport
 Tillamook County Transportation District
 Port of Tillamook Bay Railroad

Notable people 

 Lars Larson, conservative talk radio show host
 Bridget Marquardt, actress and model
 Jacob Young, soap opera actor
 Jerry Kilgore, country singer

References

External links

 Listing for Tillamook in the Oregon Blue Book
 Tillamook Chamber of Commerce

 
1891 establishments in Oregon
Cities in Oregon
Cities in Tillamook County, Oregon
County seats in Oregon
Populated coastal places in Oregon
Populated places established in 1891
Oregon placenames of Native American origin